Felicity Marion Peel Rea (née Corbin, born c. 1937), known as Flick Rea, is an English Liberal Democrat politician in Camden, north west London, who for 35 years represented the Fortune Green ward on Camden Council, before her retirement in 2021.

Early life and education

Rea, originally named Marion Felicity Peel Corbin, was the daughter of Lieutenant Colonel Peel Corbin and his wife. Her father, a descendant of Sir Robert Peel, was headmaster at Huish's Grammar School. His daughter was educated at Weirfield School in Taunton. It had been her ambition to be an actress since the age of five, and she appeared in local amateur stage productions with the Pleiades Players and Taunton Thespians. After leaving school, she trained at Bristol's Hartley Hodder School of Drama, and was by then known as Felicity Peel Corbin. During this period, she won the Hartly Hodder Cup for the best acting performance at the Taunton and Somerset Music and Drama Festival in 1954, and the London Academy of Music and Dramatic Art's silver medal.

Peel-Corbin then completed a two-year course at the Royal Academy of Dramatic Art in London, leaving in July 1958. Whilst there, a fellow student was Glenda Jackson, who would later become Peel-Corbin's MP. By the early 1960s, Peel-Corbin was using Felicity Peel as her stage name. She worked with the Salisbury Repertory Company, and a repertory company in Oldham. Her early credits included The Marriage-Go-Round, The Boy Friend, Simple Spymen, Watch It, Sailor, Julius Caesar and Love in a Mist. she also worked on tour where she met her future husband in a production of “Love from a Stranger” ./> She had a small role in the film “A kind of loving” and also in a 1961 episode of ABC Television's The Avengers.

Political career

Camden Council 
In 1974, Rea joined the Liberal Party. She first stood for election to Camden Council in a by-election in April 1980, following the resignation of Fortune Green ward's Conservative councillor Richard Almond. Representing the Liberals, Rea came third behind the Labour candidate, and the Conservatives held the seat. Rea again stood for the two-member Fortune Green ward (based around the area of the same name) in 1982, this time as a Liberal and Social Democratic Party Alliance candidate. The Liberals had been third behind Labour in Fortune Green at the 1978 election (when the ward was created), with the Conservatives winning both seats. However, Rea and her fellow Alliance candidate Eamond Hitchcock finished second to the Conservatives in 1982, with Rea being the closer of the two to being elected in what was a three-way marginal.

At the next council election, in 1986, Rea and Roger Billins gained both Fortune Green seats for the Alliance, under the banner of Liberal Social Democratic Party Alliance Spotlight Team. She remained a councillor continuously from that point on. In 1990, she was elected as a Liberal Democratic Spotlight Team candidate, the Liberals by that point having merged with the Social Democratic Party to form the Liberal Democrats.

She was elected as the leader of Camden Liberal Democrats from 1986 to 2005, and again from 2014 to 2020. In 2001, Rea became the first Liberal Democrat to chair anything on Camden Council. She oversaw the scrutiny panel on the council's administration of its commercial properties and produced a report with the conclusion that "We're [Camden council] not actually very good landlords". In 2013, the Liberal Democrat Group objected to the ruling Labour administration's choice of mayor, and unsuccessfully nominated Rea instead.

She was the sole Liberal Democrat on the council in 2014, after all the others had lost their seats at that year's elections. Following this, she said: "I will continue to cause trouble. I've been a councillor for 28 years. I intend to put the knowledge to good use for the benefit of residents in Fortune Green."

At the Liberal Democrats' 2018 campaign launch, the former Scottish Secretary Alistair Carmichael endorsed Rea's successful bid for re-election, calling her "formidable". In November that year, a motion was put forward to the council by Rea and her colleague Luisa Porritt calling for a second referendum on Britain's departure from the European Union; with the support of Labour councillors, it was passed. Rea retired on 4 June 2021, and her seat was retained for the Liberal Democrats at a 22 July by-election by Nancy Jirira. On 21 June 2022, Rea was appointed an honorary alderman of the London Borough of Camden.

In 2013, Rea received an MBE for services to local government. The Hampstead & Highgate Express has dubbed her "The Empress of West Hampstead" (the area being considered part of the Fortune Green ward she represented). Similarly, her son Robert described Rea as "the Queen of West Hampstead". She took part in readings of poetry at a 2016 recital in West Hampstead Library.

Other roles 
In 1997, Rea became a part-time administrator for the London Liberal Democrats. After deciding to vote for Susan Kramer as the party's first London mayoral candidate at the 2000 election, Rea worked as Kramer's secretary.

She has acted as a member of the London Arts Council, sat on the board of the Hampstead Theatre and been Chair of the Local Government Association's Culture, Tourism and Sports Board. Locally, Rea has been an active member of the community pressure group West Hampstead Amenity and Transport group (WHAT), which she co-founded, and the consumer organisation London Regional Passengers Committee (LRPC). For a number of years, Rea was secretary of the Pedestrians Association. She was appointed by Camden Council as a Trustee of the Charles Dickens Museum.

Personal life 
On 15 July 1962, she married fellow actor Charles Patrick Rea in Staplegrove, Taunton. The couple moved to West Hampstead, north west London, and had a son, journalist Robert Rea, and a daughter, producer Kate Rea. Charles, who had numerous television and film credits, predeceased his wife. He died on 17 March 1992, aged 69.

References

Liberal Democrats (UK) councillors
21st-century English women politicians
20th-century English women politicians
Councillors in the London Borough of Camden
People from West Hampstead
People from the London Borough of Camden
Women councillors in England